Heather Ridge is located in the Slate Range in Alberta.
Like other mountains in Banff Park, Heather Ridge is composed of sedimentary rock laid down during the Precambrian to Jurassic periods. Formed in shallow seas, this sedimentary rock was pushed east and over the top of younger rock during the Laramide orogeny.

Climate

Based on the Köppen climate classification, Heather Ridge is located in a subarctic climate zone with cold, snowy winters, and mild summers.

References

See also
Geography of Alberta
Geology of Alberta

External links
 Parks Canada web site: Banff National Park

Two-thousanders of Alberta
Mountains of Banff National Park